Aaron Fitzgerald McKie (born October 2, 1972) is an American basketball coach and former professional basketball player who played 14 seasons in the National Basketball Association (NBA). He is currently the special advisor for athletics at his alma mater Temple University. From 2019 until 2023 he served as the head coach for the Temple men's basketball team. Selected by the Portland Trail Blazers 17th overall in the 1994 NBA draft, McKie spent time as a point guard, shooting guard or small forward throughout his professional playing career from 1994 to 2007.

High school basketball career
McKie attended Philadelphia's Simon Gratz High School, where he was a letterman in basketball. As a senior, he was an All-Scholastic choice and an All-Southern Pennsylvania choice, and helped lead his team to the Public League championship and a 26-4 record, averaging 18.9 points, 9.9 rebounds and 7.2 assists per game. He graduated from Gratz in 1990.

College career
After redshirting his freshman year, McKie finished his three-year career at Temple University tied for sixth on the school's all-time scoring list with 1,650 points, averaging 17.9 points per game while starting all 92 games. He teamed up with eventual All-Star Eddie Jones at Temple, and was named first-team All-Atlantic 10 and he was named to the A-10 all-tournament team as a senior. As a junior, he was the 1993 Atlantic 10 Conference Player of the Year, after averaging 20.6 points per game.

NBA career

McKie was selected in the first round (17th overall) of the 1994 NBA Draft by the Portland Trail Blazers. He has since played for the Detroit Pistons, the Philadelphia 76ers, and the Los Angeles Lakers. In the 2000–01 NBA season, McKie was named NBA Sixth Man of the Year, becoming the first Sixers player since Bobby Jones in 1983 to win that honor. McKie played an important role in the NBA Finals-bound team, serving as backup to Eric Snow and Allen Iverson and occasionally played as a starter. He notched consecutive triple doubles during the 2000-01 season, December 30, 2000 vs. the Sacramento Kings (19 points, 10 rebounds, 14 assists) and January 3, 2001 vs. the Atlanta Hawks (11 points, 10 rebounds, 10 assists).

On August 12, 2005, he was waived by the 76ers as part of the one-time "Amnesty provision" of the new labor agreement, allowing the 76ers to waive a player to avoid the luxury tax on his salary.  McKie signed with the Lakers on August 22, 2005 and played 14 regular-season games for them.

In October 2007, McKie rejoined the 76ers as an assistant coach.

On February 1, 2008, McKie, who was a Sixers assistant coach at the time, was traded by the Lakers to the Memphis Grizzlies, along with Kwame Brown, Javaris Crittenton, rights to Marc Gasol, and the 2008 and 2010 first-round draft picks, for Pau Gasol.  The Lakers' acquisition of Pau Gasol was only approved by the league office when the Lakers called McKie to inform him that they wanted to sign him and throw him in for salary cap reasons. He was released from the Grizzlies on May 9, 2008.

Coaching career

Philadelphia 76ers (2007-2013)
After being released by the Grizzlies, McKie rejoined the Philadelphia coaching staff as an assistant in September 2008. He remained in that position until 2013.

Temple Owls (2014-2023)
McKie left the Sixers staff to join the Temple men's basketball staff under Fran Dunphy. Temple University announced that he would replace Dunphy as the head coach of the men's basketball team starting with the 2019 season.

2020-2021
McKie's first two seasons coaching Temple were both limited due to the COVID-19 pandemic. In 2020, the AAC tournament and eventually the season was canceled. In 2021, almost all of out-of-conference play was canceled and the Owls only played 16 total games.

2022
McKie's first full season with the Owls came in the 2021-22 season. Temple went 17-12 and were seeded #4 in the 2022 AAC tournament and lost in the quarterfinals to Tulane.

2023
Entering the 2022-2023 season, Temple had high expectations with the return of multiple starters including guards Damian Dunn and Khalif Battle. However, the season was an up-and-down one for the Owls. The team started the season with a shocking loss to Wagner, but then defeated the #16 team in the nation, Villanova in their next game. The Owls won their first three games in the Big 5, but lost to Penn and only clinched a co-share of the Big 5. The highlight of the season came when Temple beat Houston the #1 team in the nation. However, the Owls struggled down the stretch and lost in the quarterfinals of the 2023 AAC tournament to Cincinnati. 

On March 13, 2023, Temple announced that McKie stepped down as the men’s basketball coach and would take on a new role as the as a special advisor to the athletics department.

Career statistics

Regular season 

|-
| style="text-align:left;"| 
| style="text-align:left;"| Portland
| 45|| 20 || 18.4 || .444 || .393 || .685 || 2.9 || 2.0 || 0.8 || 0.4 || 6.5
|-
| style="text-align:left;"| 
| style="text-align:left;"| Portland
| 81 || 73 || 27.9 || .467 || .325 || .764 || 3.8 || 2.5 || 1.1 || 0.3 || 10.7
|-
| style="text-align:left;"| 
| style="text-align:left;"| Portland
| 41 || 8 || 18.9 || .340 || .418 || .837 || 2.3 || 2.0 || 0.8 || 0.4 || 4.1
|-
| style="text-align:left;"| 
| style="text-align:left;"| Detroit
| 42 || 3 || 20.2 || .464 || .375 || .836 || 3.0 || 1.8 || 1.0 || 0.2 || 6.3
|-
| style="text-align:left;"| 
| style="text-align:left;"| Detroit
| 24 || 1 || 19.7 || .413 || .176 || .870 || 2.8 || 1.6 || 1.0 || 0.0 || 4.5
|-
| style="text-align:left;"| 
| style="text-align:left;"| Philadelphia
| 57 || 31 || 23.5 || .347 || .196 || .688 || 2.9 || 2.4 || 1.4 || 0.2 || 3.9
|-
| style="text-align:left;"| 
| style="text-align:left;"| Philadelphia
| 50 || 4 || 19.2 || .401 || .194 || .710 || 2.8 || 2.0 || 1.3 || 0.1 || 4.8
|-
| style="text-align:left;"| 
| style="text-align:left;"| Philadelphia
| 82 || 14 || 23.8 || .411 || .364 || .829 || 3.0 || 2.9 || 1.3 || 0.2 || 8.0
|-
| style="text-align:left;"| 
| style="text-align:left;"| Philadelphia
| 76 || 33 || 31.5 || .473 || .312 || .768 || 4.1 || 5.0 || 1.4 || 0.1 || 11.6
|-
| style="text-align:left;"| 
| style="text-align:left;"| Philadelphia
| 48 || 16 || 30.6 || .449 || .398 || .787 || 4.0 || 3.7 || 1.2 || 0.3 || 12.2
|-
| style="text-align:left;"| 
| style="text-align:left;"| Philadelphia
| 80 || 40 || 29.7 || .429 || .330 || .836 || 4.4 || 3.5 || 1.6 || 0.1 || 9.0
|-
| style="text-align:left;"| 
| style="text-align:left;"| Philadelphia
| 75 || 41 || 28.2 || .459 || .436 || .757 || 3.4 || 2.6 || 1.1 || 0.3 || 9.2
|-
| style="text-align:left;"| 
| style="text-align:left;"| Philadelphia
| 68 || 3 || 16.4 || .430 || .323 || .625 || 2.5 || 1.5 || 0.7 || 0.3 || 2.2
|-
| style="text-align:left;"| 
| style="text-align:left;"| L.A. Lakers
| 14 || 0 || 8.6 || .250 || .000 || .500 || 1.4 || 0.8 || 0.4 || 0.0 || 0.5
|-
| style="text-align:left;"| 
| style="text-align:left;"| L.A. Lakers
| 10 || 0 || 13.1 || .647 || .000 || .000 || 1.8 || 1.3 || 0.4 || 0.0 || 2.2
|- class="sortbottom"
| style="text-align:center;" colspan="2"| Career
| 793 || 287 || 24.2 || .438 || .350 || .779 || 3.3 || 2.7 || 1.2 || 0.2 || 7.4

Playoffs

|-
| style="text-align:left;"| 1995
| style="text-align:left;"| Portland
| 3 || 0 || 11.3 || .571 || .500 || .000 || 0.7 || 0.3 || 1.0 || 0.0 || 5.7
|-
| style="text-align:left;"| 1996
| style="text-align:left;"| Portland
| 5 || 4 || 26.8 || .367 || .250 || .778 || 3.6 || 1.8 || 1.2 || 0.4 || 6.2
|-
| style="text-align:left;"| 1997
| style="text-align:left;"| Detroit
| 5 || 0 || 19.4 || .350 || .200 || .000 || 2.0 || 2.0 || 1.2 || 0.4 || 3.0
|-
| style="text-align:left;"| 1999
| style="text-align:left;"| Philadelphia
| 6 || 0 || 16.2 || .304 || .000 || .857 || 2.5 || 1.8 || 0.7 || 0.0 || 3.3
|-
| style="text-align:left;"| 2000
| style="text-align:left;"| Philadelphia
| 10 || 6 || 33.1 || .485 || .343 || .839 || 3.6 || 4.6 || 0.4 || 0.2 || 13.8
|-
| style="text-align:left;"| 2001
| style="text-align:left;"| Philadelphia
| 23 || 16 || 38.8 || .415 || .422 || .787 || 5.2 || 5.3 || 1.5 || 0.1 || 14.6
|-
| style="text-align:left;"| 2002
| style="text-align:left;"| Philadelphia
| 5 || 0 || 29.2 || .435 || .375 || .700 || 3.6 || 2.4 || 2.0 || 0.0 || 10.6
|-
| style="text-align:left;"| 2003
| style="text-align:left;"| Philadelphia
| 12 || 0 || 26.3 || .535 || .556 || .857 || 3.6 || 1.8 || 0.8 || 0.2 || 7.8
|-
| style="text-align:left;"| 2005
| style="text-align:left;"| Philadelphia
| 5 || 0 || 17.0 || .429 || .333 || .000 || 2.4 || 1.0 || 0.8 || 0.0 || 1.4
|-
| style="text-align:left;"| 2006
| style="text-align:left;"| L.A. Lakers
| 1 || 0 || 8.0 || .000 || .000 || .000 || 0.0 || 0.0 || 0.0 || 0.0 || 0.0
|- class="sortbottom"
| style="text-align:center;" colspan="2"| Career
| 75 || 26 || 28.5 || .437 || .385 || .801 || 3.6 || 3.2 || 1.1 || 0.1 || 9.5

Head coaching record

College

Personal life
He is a third cousin of Jason McKie of the NFL. Allen Iverson once said in an interview that Aaron McKie was his most influential teammate.

References

External links
Aaron McKie at NBA.com

Aaron McKie Lakerfreak.com
Aaron McKie Released

1972 births
Living people
African-American basketball coaches
African-American basketball players
American men's basketball coaches
American men's basketball players
Basketball coaches from Pennsylvania
Basketball players from Philadelphia
College men's basketball head coaches in the United States
Detroit Pistons players
Los Angeles Lakers players
Philadelphia 76ers assistant coaches
Philadelphia 76ers players
Point guards
Portland Trail Blazers draft picks
Portland Trail Blazers players
Shooting guards
Small forwards
Temple Owls men's basketball coaches
Temple Owls men's basketball players
21st-century African-American sportspeople
20th-century African-American sportspeople